Thomas Purdie FRS LLD (1843–1916) was a 19th/20th century Scottish chemist. With James Irvine, Purdie is known for his work on understanding the chemical structure of simple sugars. The building that houses the School of Chemistry (that he helped found) at the University of St Andrews bears his name.

Life

Purdie was born in Biggar, South Lanarkshire on 27 January 1843, the eldest son of Thomas Purdie (1817-1886) and his wife Margaret Smith (1831-1916). The family spent seven years in South America during his youth. His father purchased Castlecliffe in St Andrews around 1870 and, following a conversation with Thomas Henry Huxley, Thomas decided to train as an industrial chemist.

Around 1871 he joined the Royal School of Mines under Prof Frankland in London, then went to Würzburg University in Germany where he received a doctorate (PhD) in Chemistry. He spent some time teaching Chemistry in South Kensington and then in Newcastle-under-Lyme.

In 1884 he became Professor of Chemistry at St Andrews University. His students included Alexander McKenzie. In 2014 during a clear-out at St Andrews an early periodic table wall chart was found, established to have been purchased by Purdie in 1885.

He retired in 1909 and died in St Andrews on 14 December 1916. He is buried with his parents in the eastern cemetery extension to St Andrews Cathedral churchyard. The grave lies against the main step in ground level, just below the upper terrace.

Family

He was married to Mary Anne (1843-1918).

References

1843 births
1916 deaths
People from South Lanarkshire
Scottish chemists
Academics of the University of St Andrews
Fellows of the Royal Society